London School of Management Education (informally LSME) is a for-profit private Higher education in the United Kingdom. LSME was founded in 2007 by Dr Ravi Kumar and Dr Sarita Parhi. It is currently listed as an alternative Higher Education provider (AP). The School offers diplomas, undergraduate and postgraduate courses in Business Management, Teacher Training, Health and Social Care and Hospitality and Tourism.
To support the UK government's effort to bridge the widening gap of educationally and economically deprived children and young people and also young people with special needs and those in the category of Not in Education, Employment, or Training (NEET), LSME has an ambitious Access and Participation Plan, which is approved by the Office for Students. LSME has students who are from 35 nationalities enrolled across its Diploma, undergraduate and postgraduate programmes. All degrees are awarded by external institutions.

History 
The London School of Management Education was established as an academic learning centre for the less privileged to take up Higher Education. The Founders Dr. Ravi Kumar (Executive Director) and Dr. Sarita Parhi (Principal), set up the College at the Knowledge Dock of the University of East London, University Way, Royal Docks, London. It officially started in 2007 with the delivery of teacher training courses for the UK and EU learners.
In 2009, the school began delivering Diploma in Teaching in the Lifelong Learning Sector programme for government funding and gradually introduced the Health and Social Care and Business Management qualifications in 2010. LSME further introduced Higher National Diploma and BSc in Health and Social Care and Business qualifications in addition to the Diploma in Education and Training programme. Further programmes; BSc International Tourism and Hospitality Management, Master of Education and MSc Business Management have been added to the portfolio of programmes delivered.

 2009 – 48 Bishopsgate and thereafter moved into a rented property at Curtain Road, London. 
 2013 - To further widen its scope of the provision, the school began holding some of its classes in another rented property on Monteagale Court, Wakering Road, Barking. 
 2017 - LSME officially opened its new premises in Gants Hill (Cambrian House on Cranbrook Road) in a Ribbon Cutting Ceremony held on the 20th of April 2017. The event was attended by The Lord Northbrook, Cllr Gurdial Bhamra, the Mayor of the London Borough of Redbridge, Mr Mike Gapes, the (then) MP for Ilford South, Hassan Shifau, the Deputy Ambassador for the Republic of Maldives in the UK.
 2020 - the school applied and received extra funding from the HSBC bank UK as part of its £14bn lending fund to support management education schools in the UK.

LSME organises a series of annual International Research Conferences focused on Responsible Research and Innovations (RRI). These conferences have also produced reports such as the Report on the Proceedings of the International Conference on Responsible Research in Education and Management and its Impact. To nurture the culture of responsible research and innovations, the school had signed a memorandum of understanding (MoU) with the Panjab University in recognition of the establishment of a new collaborative working arrangement for responsible research in India. The school is affiliated to the United Nations Principles of Responsible Management Education (PRME) whose principles are focused on engaging businesses and management schools to ensure future leaders are provided with the skills needed to achieve the Sustainable Development Goals(SDGs).

Academics 
London School of Management Education (LSME) do not currently own the powers to award degrees or diplomas in the UK. All degree-level programmes offered at the London campuses are validated and awarded by reputable UK academic institutions. As of 2019, the school offers courses in a range of business management and social care subjects, including two Master's degree programmes validated and awarded by the University of Chichester while OND and HND level programmes are awarded by Pearson Education.

QAA Reviews 
The LSME (and its associated division) underwent its first and successful Review of Educational Oversight in 2014 by the UK's Quality Assurance Agency for Higher Education (QAA) and has continued to have annual monitoring visits as well as full higher education review. LSME's last monitoring by the QAA was published in February 2019 and concluded that:
 The maintenance of the academic standards of awards offered on behalf of external degree-awarding bodies and other awarding organisations met UK expectations
 The School has a clear understanding of how the admissions process is supporting access for students of different backgrounds and the School takes active steps to target under-represented groups. 
 In the last year, the School has continued to develop partnerships with universities with a view to furthering research and enabling students to make research proposals.
 The good practice in the context of individualised learning and the development of research activity continues to the benefit of both staff and students.
 While the School has made considerable progress with the recommendation in relation to trends in complaints and appeals, there was insufficient evidence within Academic Board minutes to demonstrate a strategic response to analyses of complaints received.

Campuses and locations 

LSME is located in the bustling area of Gants Hill in Ilford, London Borough of Redbridge, close to many amenities for students. Nearest London Underground Station is Gants Hill Station on Central Line, which is a minute walk from the second site of LSME and a 2-minute walk from the main site. Ilford Station on TfL Rail is just about 10 minutes by local bus service. Gants Hill bus station is right in front of LSME's new site and Gants Hill Library is located just a stone-throw. To cater to the growing demands for expansion and to improve upon the learning environment offered to students, LSME acquired an additional teaching and learning facility on Cranbrook Road, Gants Hill, Essex and developed a modern hi-tech teaching and learning environment for the benefit of the students.

Organization and administration 
LSME is governed by a board of directors. The school had 274 registered students, of whom 62 were enrolled under the University of Chichester programmes and the remainder on Pearson programmes. The school has a total of 13 teaching staff, of whom seven are employed on a full-time basis and six on a part-time basis in 2018.

Achievements 
LSME is a student-focused and student-centred learning environment which is reflected in its achievement of 97.5% overall student satisfaction rate in the National Student Survey of 2019. This puts the school among the top ranks in overall students’ satisfaction in England.
The official Teaching Excellence Framework (TEF) ratings for universities and colleges in 2019 indicated that the school was awarded a Bronze which is a satisfactory rating by a panel looking at a range of measures centred around 'teaching quality', 'learning environment' and 'outcomes'.

References

External links 
 

For-profit universities and colleges in Europe